The Wych Elm cultivar Ulmus glabra 'Fastigiata Variegata' was listed in the Baudriller (Angers, France) nursery catalogue in 1880.

Description
The tree was described as a variegated, pyramidal Exeter Elm.

Cultivation
No specimens are known to survive.

References

Wych elm cultivar
Ulmus articles missing images
Ulmus
Missing elm cultivars